Tony Mundine may refer to:
 Tony Mundine (boxer) (born 1951), Australian boxer
 Anthony Mundine (born 1975), his son, boxer and former professional rugby league footballer